The 1859 Erzurum earthquake occurred at 10:30 on 2 June. It had a magnitude of 6.1 and a maximum intensity of IX on the Mercalli intensity scale, causing 15,000 casualties. The earthquake destroyed much of the city of Erzurum.

See also
List of earthquakes in Turkey
List of historical earthquakes

References

1859 Erzurum
1859 earthquakes
1859 in the Ottoman Empire
1859
1859 in Asia
June 1859 events 
1859 disasters in the Ottoman Empire